Edwin Wilkie "Ted" Corboy (24 August 1896 – 6 August 1950) was an Australian politician. From 1918 to 2010, he held the record as the youngest ever Australian Member of Parliament.

Early life

Born in Victoria, he was educated in Western Australia at Perth Boys' School, and enlisted for military service in June 1915, after having previously been rejected.  He served at Gallipoli and later in France, where he was wounded twice, first at Pozières and later at Flers, before being invalided to England because of injury to his eyes, the result of a gas attack.  On his return to Western Australia in May 1917, he worked as a clerk in the records branch of the Western Australian Lands Department and was an active member of the Labour Party.

Political career

Federal politics
At the age of 21, Corboy unsuccessfully contested the 1917 Subiaco by-election for a seat in the Legislative Assembly of Western Australia. He was subsequently elected to the Australian House of Representatives in the 1918 by-election for the Division of Swan. He won the by-election in somewhat unusual circumstances, winning the safe Nationalist seat for the Labor Party. The conservative vote was split because two conservative parties, the Nationalists and the Country Party, both contested the election. Corboy received the highest number of primary votes and won the "first past the post" contest. This unexpected outcome led to the introduction of preferential voting in Australia.  Corboy, who was 22 when he was elected, became the youngest person ever elected to the House of Representatives and held that record until Wyatt Roy, aged 20, won the Division of Longman in the 2010 federal election.

Corboy made his maiden House of Representatives speech in November 1918, during a parliamentary debate on the Defence Bill. The Argus reported that Corboy "disagreed with the idea of allowing courts-martial to try soldiers for murder and to punish them with death."  The newspaper further reported that Corboy spoke clearly and with confidence, creating a good impression.  In 1919, Corboy was censured by the central executive of the Victorian branch of the Labour party for supporting the deportation of all aliens interned during World War I from Australia. The executive, in condemning Corboy, claimed his stance was "inconsistent with principles of liberty and justice".  Corboy, who was active in representing the interests of repatriated and demobilised veterans, had expressed concern that jobs in Western Australia's timber industry were being filled with Austrians released from internment and returning to their old jobs, while returned soldiers were not able to obtain work.

Corboy was a state delegate to the federal executive of the Returned Sailors and Soldiers Imperial League (RSSIL), a predecessor of the Returned Services League, and in 1919 attended the RSSIL's fourth annual conference in Adelaide.  In June 1919, Corboy made a speech to dock workers, following a period of industrial unrest, including riots, at the Fremantle wharf.  He called for a federal election and stated that he would "a thousand times rather have been wounded in a wharf riot in Fremantle than fighting for the capitalistic rulers of the world in France".  The comments were strongly criticised by the Kalgoorlie branch of the Returned Soldiers' Association, who called for his replacement as a Western Australian delegate to the federal executive of the RSSIL.

In the 1919 Australian federal election, Corboy again stood for the seat of Swan, where he won the primary vote but was defeated on preferences by the Country Party's John Prowse.

Western Australian state politics
After his defeat in 1919, Corboy remained involved in Labour politics and in 1921 was elected to the Western Australian Legislative Assembly as the member for Yilgarn. In 1921, Corboy supported Edith Cowan in voicing disagreement with a policy allowing only male guests to the Speaker's gallery. Corboy was a member of the parliamentary select committee appointed to inquire into the cashing out of soldiers' war gratuity bonds.  In 1927 Corboy expressed his support for the abolition of capital punishment in Western Australia, stating that the death penalty was not a deterrent to serious crime.  Capital punishment was only formally abolished in Western Australia in 1984.

In 1930, Corboy became the member for Yilgarn-Coolgardie, a new seat incorporating his former seat. A challenge to the validity of his election was mounted by a fellow Labor candidate, George Lambert, but was dismissed. However, Lambert defeated Corboy for Labor preselection prior to 1933 state election.

After politics
In 1939 Corboy was again called to military service, serving until 1945, when he returned to Australia and worked as a public servant in Perth.  He died on August 6, 1950. After his death, he was described by the Daily News as "one of the most colourful people in Australian politics".

See also

Baby of the house, an unofficial title given to the youngest member of a parliamentary house

References

Australian Labor Party members of the Parliament of Australia
Members of the Australian House of Representatives for Swan
Members of the Australian House of Representatives
1896 births
1950 deaths
Australian Labor Party members of the Parliament of Western Australia
20th-century Australian politicians